Tetrorchis is a monotypic genus of deep-sea hydrozoan in the family Rhopalonematidae. It is represented by the species Tetrorchis erythrogaster.

References

Rhopalonematidae
Animals described in 1909